Official texts, as defined in Article 2(4) of the Berne Convention for the Protection of Literary and Artistic Works, are texts of a legislative, administrative and legal nature (e.g. statute laws, administrative regulations and court decisions) and the official translations of such texts.

The Convention indicates that it shall be left to the discretion of each member country of the Berne Convention to determine the protection to be granted to such official texts in that country.

Generally, member countries of the Convention include official texts in the public domain. However, the governments of the United Kingdom and some Commonwealth countries claim a Crown copyright in their works. Many republics of the Commonwealth also copyright their official works, though they have no crown copyright.

Table

See also
Consumer rights
Edict of government

Notes and references

Copyright law
Intellectual property treaties
Copyright law lists